The Asian Science Camp (ASC) is an annual forum for pre-collegiate and college students which aims at promoting discussion and cooperation among Asian students for the betterment of science in the Asian region. The first ASC was held at Taipei in 2007, and was subsequently held at Bali (2008), Tsukuba (Japan) (2009), Mumbai (2010), Daejeon (South Korea) (2011), Hebrew University of Jerusalem (Jerusalem, Israel) (2012). This idea of an annual camp was co-proposed by Yuan Tseh Lee and Masatoshi Koshiba at the 2005 Nobel Laureate Meetings at Lindau. The ASC is modeled after the Lindau meetings.

Background
The idea of the Asian Science Camp was co-proposed in September 2005 after the 55th Annual meeting of Nobel Laureates and Students in Lindau, Germany, by Professor Yuan Tseh Lee (1986 Nobel Laureate in Chemistry) from Chinese Taipei,  and Professor Masatoshi Koshiba (2002 Nobel Laureate in Physics) from Japan. The proposal expressed the aim to enlighten science talented youths through discussions and dialogues with top scholars in the world, and promoting international friendship and cooperation among best young students of the next generation in Asia. The Lindau Meetings will serve as a model.  The Asian Science Camp would invite a dozen Nobel Laureates or world-distinguished scientists as speakers and devise an interesting program to attract all the participants, including plenary sessions, round table discussions, student master dialogues, a creative poster competition, social events and excursion. The working language would be English. This proposal was soon discussed in a board meeting of the Wu Chien-Shiung Education Foundation and was approved unanimously by the board.

The governing body of the Asian Science Camp is the International Board of Asian Science Camp (IBASC). IBASC is a not- for- profit organization, consisting of non-governmental educational institutions. The 2007 Asian Science Camp was organized by the Wu Chien-Shiung Education Foundation with the assistance of Academia Sinica in Taiwan. This non-government Foundation was established in 1995 to commemorate the monumental contributions of Madame Dr. Wu Chien-Shiung to physics and her lifelong love for science education. Since its inauguration in Taiwan in August 2007, the Asian Science Camp has become an international annual event in Asia.

Host Countries
2022 -  Daejeon, South Korea

2021 - Postponed due to COVID-19

2020 - Postponed due to COVID-19

2019 -  Shantou, China

2018 -  Manado, Indonesia

2017 -  Kampar, Malaysia

2016 -   Bengaluru, India

2015 -  Bangkok, Thailand

2014 -  Singapore

2013 -  Tsukuba, Japan

2012 -  Jerusalem, Israel

2011 -  Daejeon, South Korea

2010 -  Tsukuba, Japan

2009 -  Mumbai, India

2008 -  Bali, Indonesia

2007 -  Taipei, Taiwan

First Asian Science Camp 

The First Asian Science Camp was held at Taipei, Taiwan 5 August to 11 August 2007. It organized by Wu Chien Shiung Foundation with assistance by Academia Sinica in Taiwan. Around 400 students and five Noble Laureates attended this event.

The program of the First Asian Science Camp was supported and funded by Ministry of Education, National Science Council, Academia Sinica, National Women's League of the R.O.C., Macronix International Co., Taiwan Semiconductor Manufacture Company Ltd., Hewlett-Packard Company (Taiwan), MediaTek Inc., Powerchip Semiconductor Corp., Li Ching Cultural and Education Foundation.

Sixth Asian Science Camp

The Sixth Asian Science Camp hosted by Israel took place in the Hebrew University Safra Campus Jerusalem in 2012 was, by then, the largest event in terms of the number of students from when the project first began. Approximately 300 students, 5 Nobel Prize recipients, and 20 leading experts attended the event.

Tenth Asian Science Camp 

Asian Science Camp 2016, was organised by jointly by Department of Science and Technology, Government of India and Indian Institute of Science from 21 August to 27 August 2016. The venue for the program was J N Tata Auditorium, Indian Institute of Science, Bangalore, India. The program was divided into academic and sightseeing and excursions programs.

Fourteenth Asian Science Camp 

After a two-year delay due to the Covid-19 pandemic, Asian Science Camp 2022 was held in Daejeon, South Korea. This was the first hybrid offline and online conference and had 250 participants from 25 countries.

References 

Recurring events established in 2007
Science events